At least seven vessels of the Royal Navy have borne the name HMS Firefly:

, was a vessel built in Bermuda that the Royal Navy purchased there in 1801. She was the former John Gordon, which probably had been a privateer. British Admiralty records list an armed ship built in Bermuda in 1801, and purchased in 1803.
 was the French privateer schooner Poisson Volant, of 130 tons (bm), which the Royal Navy captured in 1803.  She was wrecked on 17 November 1807 off Curacao; no survivors.
 was a 14-gun schooner, the ex-Spanish prize Antelope captured in February 1808 and purchased. She was renamed HMS Antelope in 1812, or possibly in 1809, and was broken up in 1814.
 , a schooner wrecked on 27 February 1835 on the Northern Triangles, off Belize with the loss of thirteen of her 23 crew.
She was broken up at Malta in 1866.
 , a British .
 , a British  that the Ottomans captured but that the British recaptured at the Battle of Nahr-al-Kalek in February 1917.
 , a British trawler that operated between 1930 and 1961, and that between September 1939 to October 1945 served as a minesweeper.

References

Royal Navy ship names